Lilí Brillanti (born María del Roble Brillanti Ramírez on March 11, 1973, in Mexico City, Mexico) is a Mexican actress and TV hostess.

Biography 
Brillanti was born on March 11, 1972, in Mexico City, Mexico. She was a daughter of José Mucio Brillanti Sánchez and Cristina Ramírez. Brillanti has two sisters, Araceli and Socorro. She studied communication sciences at the National Autonomous University of Mexico and dramatic art at the National Institute of Fine Arts. She is also a graduate of the Center for Artistic Education (CEA de Televisa).

In 1994 it was announced in the television program Pácatelas presented by Paco Stanley and in 1999 she was a program reporter Duro y Directo. Later, she joined the cast of Todo se vale and en Vida TV presented with Galilea Montijo and Héctor Sandarti. In 2010 she joined the ranks of TV Azteca.

Personal life 
Brillanti was married to Jaime Rivas from 1994 until 2011.

In June 2011, she began dating Jesús Zapico, a Spanish businessman, and after a seven-month relationship, they married in January 2012, the same year their son, Mael, was born, on May 13.

Filmography

References

External links 
 

1973 births
Living people
Mexican telenovela actresses
Mexican television actresses
Mexican television presenters
Actresses from Mexico City
20th-century Mexican actresses
21st-century Mexican actresses
Mexican people of Italian descent
Mexican women television presenters